Robert "Bobby" Bunda (born April 25, 1947) is a former Democratic member of the Hawaii Senate, representing the 22nd District from 1994 through 2010, when he resigned his position in an unsuccessful bid for Lieutenant Governor of Hawaii. Previously he was a member of the Hawaii House of Representatives from 1983 through 1994.

He is the first Filipino American to attain the presidency of any state legislature in the United States.

He attended Ludwigsburg American High School in Stuttgart, Germany, Leilehua High School, Texas Wesleyan College where he earned his Bachelor of Science in 1974, and the University of Dallas for his graduate studies.

The 2009 Achievement Award for Public Affairs was conferred to Bunda by Filipinas Magazine.  The magazine, self-described as "the Magazine for Filipinos Worldwide" named Bunda as among the "brightest lights" of the Filipino community.
  
Bunda announced on October 13, 2009, that he had entered the 2010 race for Lieutenant Governor for the State of Hawaiʻi. Bunda subsequently lost the election to former state legislator and state party chairman Brian Schatz.

References

External links 
 www.RobertBunda.com  Official individual website.
 Hawaii State Legislature - Senator Robert Bunda official government site
 Project Vote Smart - Senator Robert 'Bobby' Bunda (HI) profile
 Follow the Money - Robert Bunda
 2006 2004 2002 1998 campaign contributions

1947 births
American politicians of Filipino descent
Asian-American people in Hawaii politics
Hawaii politicians of Filipino descent
Presidents of the Hawaii Senate
Democratic Party Hawaii state senators
Living people
Texas Wesleyan University alumni
University of Dallas alumni